Stendal is a railway station in the town of Stendal, Saxony-Anhalt, Germany. The station lies on the Berlin-Lehrte railway, Hanover–Berlin high-speed railway, Magdeburg-Wittenberge railway, Stendal–Uelzen railway, Stendal-Tangermünde railway and Stendal–Niedergörne railway. It is an important railway hub for regional trains and is also used by Intercity and Intercity-Express (ICE) trains regularly. Until the winter 2012 timetable Stendal station was only by Deutsche Bahn trains. Since December 2012, the station has also been served by some services operated by Ostdeutsche Eisenbahn. It is classified by Deutsche Bahn as a category 3 station.

History
On 7 July 1849, Stendal received its first railway connection with the opening of the Magdeburg-Wittenberge railway by the Magdeburg-Wittenberge Company (Magdeburg-Wittenbergeschen Eisenbahn-Gesellschaft). This ran on the eastern outskirts of the town and there was a station at Stendal—later called Stendal Ost (east)—from its opening.

During the course of construction of the Stendal–Uelzen railway and the Berlin–Lehrte railway  in 1870, the station was moved to the southern edge of the town to allow passengers to change between the three lines. The Magdeburg-Wittenberge railway was also relocated to be connected to the new station and has run around the town to its west since then. The current station building was also built between 1869 and 1871. It suffered severe bomb damage during World war II, especially on 22nd February 1945 due to Operation Clarion and on 7th April 1945.

In April 1886, the Stendal-Tangermünde railway was connected to station.

In June 1892, a horse tramway was opened between the station forecourt and the Uenglinger Tor (Uenglingen gate); in October 1909, another horse tramway was added, but this ran between Stendal Ost station on the original Magdeburg-Wittenberge railway and the Uenglinger Tor. Both tramways were closed in October 1926 and replaced by a bus route.

In the autumn of 1908, the station was connected with the Stendal–Arendsee light railway and, in May 1914, with the Stendal–Arneburg railway after this had been converted from metre gauge to standard gauge. The line to Arendsee was closed gradually from 1978 to 1995. All operations on the line to Arneburg ended in October 1972.

The Stendal–Niedergörne railway was connected to the station in January 1977 to provide a connection to the Stendal Nuclear Power Plant, which was never completed. Since the end of passenger traffic in late 1995, the line has been used only by freight trains.

Stendal was connected to the electrical railway network in 1984 with the electrification of the line to Magdeburg.

Between 1994 and 1998, the Hanover–Berlin high-speed railway was built parallel to the Berlin-Lehrte railway. A southern bypass of Stendal was built against the wishes of the town; this is now used by most long-distance trains running on the line. Nevertheless, the first ICE train stopped at Stendal station on 27 September 1998.

State
The station has five through platform tracks and three bay platforms. Track 1 is located next to the station building and tracks 2–5 are on two island platforms. Bay platforms 6 and 7 are located east and west of the entrance building and are accessible via platform 1. The third bay platform is track 8, which is at the eastern end of the island platform that is faced by tracks 2 and 3. West of the station there is a large parking area.

Buses on several bus routes operated by Stendalbus stop outside the station. There is also a taxi stand.

Train services
Stendal is served by Intercity, Regional Express and Regional Bahn services:

References

External links

Network map

Railway stations in Saxony-Anhalt
Railway stations in Germany opened in 1871
Buildings and structures in Stendal (district)
Stendal